The 1979–80 Albanian National Championship was the 41st season of the Albanian National Championship, the top professional league for association football clubs, since its establishment in 1930.

Overview
It was contested by 14 teams, and Dinamo Tirana won the championship.

League standings

Note: 'Lokomotiva Durrës' is Teuta, 'Labinoti' is Elbasani

Results

Season statistics

Top scorers

References

Albania - List of final tables (RSSSF)

Kategoria Superiore seasons
1
Albania